Didierea madagascariensis, commonly known as the octopus tree, is a species of Didiereaceae endemic to the spiny thickets of southwestern Madagascar. It was first described scientifically by the French botanist Henri Ernest Baillon in 1880 and is the type species of the genus Didierea.

It is known in Malagasy as sohongy, sony and soribarika. Sohongy and sony come from the Tanosy dialect word songo meaning "lock of hair" or a rooster's crest or comb possibly referring to its branches that sprawl upwards.

Description
As with all members of the sub-family Didiereoideae, this is a semi-succulent woody, shrub to small tree. Spines are arranged in whorls, mostly of four. Leaves are small and narrow-lanceolate and arranged in rosettes.

References

External links

Didiereaceae
Endemic flora of Madagascar
Flora of the Madagascar spiny thickets
Plants described in 1880
Taxa named by Henri Ernest Baillon